Brody Couch (born 5 December 1999) is an Australian cricketer. He made his List A debut on 10 March 2021, for Victoria in the 2020–21 Marsh One-Day Cup. He made his first-class debut on 20 November 2021, for Victoria in the 2021–22 Sheffield Shield season. He made his Twenty20 debut on 5 December 2021, for the Melbourne Stars in the 2021–22 Big Bash League season.

In 2022, Couch was studying for a Bachelor of Criminology/Bachelor of Psychological Science at Deakin University.

References

External links
 

1999 births
Living people
Australian cricketers
Victoria cricketers
Melbourne Stars cricketers
Place of birth missing (living people)